Joselio Basilio Hanson (born August 13, 1981) is a former American football cornerback. He began his professional career by signing with the San Francisco 49ers as an undrafted free agent in 2003, and has also spent one year of his career in Europe with the Frankfurt Galaxy. He has played for the Philadelphia Eagles for six seasons starting in 2006.

He played college football at Texas Tech after transferring from El Camino Junior College.

Early years
Hanson's parents are John, a musician, and Yolanda, an opera singer. He attended St. Bernard High School in California and was a letterman in football. After not even starting as a junior, he helped lead his team to the state finals as a senior.

College career
Hanson first played college football at El Camino Junior College,  before transferring to Texas Tech for his final two years. He also received interest from Illinois and Arkansas. At Texas Tech, he majored in human development and family studies.

Professional career

San Francisco 49ers
After not being selected in the 2003 NFL Draft, Hanson was signed by the San Francisco 49ers as an undrafted free agent. He did not make the final roster as a rookie, but was retained on the team's practice squad through the regular season. In 2004 he made the active roster and went on to play in 13 games that year, starting three of them. He registered 18 solo tackles, two assists, six pass deflections and a sack.

Hanson remained a member of the 49ers through the 2005 offseason, but was cut prior to the beginning of the regular season.

Frankfurt Galaxy
After his release from the 49ers, Hanson was not picked up by another NFL team and chose to spend a season in Europe with the Frankfurt Galaxy, after they drafted him in the 6th round of the league's free agent draft. The Galaxy won the league championship in his first and only year with the team.

Philadelphia Eagles
In 2006, shortly after the conclusion of the NFL Europe season, Hanson was signed to a two-year contract by the Philadelphia Eagles. That season, Hanson played in all sixteen games for Philadelphia, starting one, garnering 26 solo tackles, nine assists, and thirteen pass deflections. In 2007 season, he again played in all sixteen games, starting four, and made 45 solo tackles and seven assists, along with a sack and a fumble recovery. This earned him a one-year contract for the 2008 season.

Hanson's number was changed from 22 to 21 during the 2008 offseason, due to Asante Samuel signing with the team. On the Thanksgiving night game against the Arizona Cardinals, Hanson started in place of an injured Samuel and recorded his first career interception. In week 17 against the Dallas Cowboys, he returned a fumble 97 yards for his first career touchdown, as part of a victory that sent the Eagles to the playoffs.

On February 20, 2009, Hanson agreed to a five-year contract with the Eagles, worth $21 million. He was scheduled to become an unrestricted free agent the following week.

On November 11, 2009 it was announced that Hanson was to be suspended for the next four games of the season due to failing a drug test before the NFC Championship the previous season. On December 7, Hanson had his suspension lifted, and was able to play on the active roster for the remainder of the season.

Hanson was released on September 3, 2011, during final roster cuts. Hanson was re-signed to a two-year contract by the Eagles on September 7, 2011.

He was released again during final roster cuts on August 31, 2012.

Oakland Raiders
Hanson was signed by Oakland Raiders on September 3, 2012. On August 27, 2013, he was placed on the injured reserve list. On August 31, 2013, he was waived with an injury settlement.

References

External links
Oakland Raiders bio
Philadelphia Eagles bio

1981 births
Living people
Players of American football from Philadelphia
Players of American football from Inglewood, California
American football cornerbacks
Texas Tech Red Raiders football players
San Francisco 49ers players
Frankfurt Galaxy players
Philadelphia Eagles players
Oakland Raiders players